Oscar "Budd" Boetticher Jr. (July 29, 1916 – November 29, 2001) was an American film director. He is best remembered for a series of low-budget Westerns he made in the late 1950s starring Randolph Scott.

Early life
Boetticher was born in Chicago. His mother died in childbirth and his father was killed in an accident shortly afterwards. He was adopted by a wealthy couple Oscar Boetticher Sr. (1867–1953) and Georgia Naas Boetticher (1888–1955) and was raised in Evansville, Indiana, along with his younger brother Henry Edward Boetticher (1924–2004). He attended Culver Military Academy where he became friends with Hal Roach Jr.

He was a star athlete at Ohio State University, until an injury ended his sports career. In 1939 he traveled to Mexico, where he learned bullfighting under Don Lorenzo Garza, Fermin Espinoza and Carlos Arruza.

Career

Early films
Boetticher worked as a crew member on Of Mice and Men (1939) and A Chump at Oxford (1940). A chance encounter with Rouben Mamoulian landed him a job as technical advisor on Blood and Sand (1941). He stayed on in Hollywood working at Hal Roach Studios doing a variety of jobs.

Columbia Pictures
Boetticher received an offer to work at Columbia Pictures as an assistant director on The More the Merrier (1943). The studio liked his work and he stayed to assist on Submarine Raider (1942), The Desperadoes (1943), Destroyer (1943), U-Boat Prisoner (1944), and Cover Girl (1944), promoted to first assistant director. Some of these were Columbia's most prestigious films and Boetticher was offered the chance to join the studio's directing program.

Boetticher's first credited film as director was a Boston Blackie film One Mysterious Night (1944). It was followed by other "B" movies: The Missing Juror (1944), Youth on Trial (1945), A Guy, a Gal and a Pal (1945), and Escape in the Fog (1945).

"They were terrible pictures”, he remarked in 1979. "We had eight or ten days to make a picture. We had all these people who later became stars, or didn't, like George Macready and Nina Foch, and you never had anybody any good. I don't mean that they weren't good but they weren't then, and neither were we."

Military service
Boetticher was commissioned as an Ensign in the U.S. Naval Photographic Science Laboratory. He made documentaries and service films including The Fleet That Came to Stay (1945) and Well Done.

Eagle Lion and Monogram
Boetticher left Columbia. He directed some films for Eagle Lion, Assigned to Danger (1948) and Behind Locked Doors (1949).

At Monogram Pictures he directed Roddy McDowall in Black Midnight (1949) and Killer Shark (1950). In between he made The Wolf Hunters (1949).

He began directing for television with Magnavox Theatre – a production of The Three Musketeers that was released theatrically in some markets as The Blade of the Musketeers.

Bullfighter and the Lady
Boetticher got his first big break when he was asked to direct Bullfighter and the Lady for John Wayne's production company, Batjac, based loosely on Boetticher's own adventures studying to be a matador in Mexico. It was the first film he signed as Budd Boetticher, rather than his given name, and it earned him an Oscar nomination for Best Original Story. But the film was edited drastically without his consent, and his career again seemed on hold. (The film has since been restored by the UCLA Film Archive and the restored print is sometimes referred to by its working title, Torero.)

Universal-International
Boetticher signed a contract to direct for Universal-International where he specialised in Westerns.

“I became a western director because they thought I looked like one and they thought I rode better than anyone else," said Boetticher later. "And I didn’t know anything about the west.”

His films there included The Cimarron Kid (1952) with Audie Murphy; Bronco Buster (1952); Red Ball Express (1952), a World War II film; Horizons West (1952) with Robert Ryan; City Beneath the Sea (1953), a treasure hunting film; Seminole (1953), a Western with Rock Hudson; The Man from the Alamo (1953) with Glenn Ford; Wings of the Hawk (1953) with Van Heflin; and East of Sumatra (1953) with Chandler and Quinn.

He started directing The Americano, an independent film with Ford, but quit. He returned to television with The Public Defender.

The Magnificent Matador
In 1955, he helmed another bullfighting drama, The Magnificent Matador, at 20th Century-Fox, which began his frequent collaboration with cinematographer Lucien Ballard. They followed it with a film noir, The Killer Is Loose (1956).

He also directed episodes of The Count of Monte Cristo.

Ranown Cycle
Boetticher finally achieved his major breakthrough when he teamed up with actor Randolph Scott and screenwriter Burt Kennedy to make Seven Men from Now (1956). It was the first of the seven films (last in 1960) that came to be known as the Ranown Cycle.

He was reunited with Scott and Kennedy on The Tall T (1957); they were joined by producer Harry Joe Brown, who would produce the six remaining films.

Boetticher directed the first three episodes of the TV series Maverick. He went back to working with Scott: Decision at Sundown (1957); Buchanan Rides Alone (1958) (not written by Kennedy); and Ride Lonesome (1959).

Westbound (1959) was made with Scott but without Kennedy or Brown. Comanche Station (1960) was made with Scott and Kennedy.

1960s
Boetticher returned to television, directing episodes of Hong Kong, Dick Powell's Zane Grey Theatre, Death Valley Days, and The Rifleman. He did a feature, The Rise and Fall of Legs Diamond (1960). He directed the first three episodes of Maverick starring James Garner then had a fundamental disagreement with writer/producer Roy Huggins involving the lead character's dialogue and never directed the series again.

Boetticher spent most of the 1960s south of the border pursuing his obsession, the documentary of his friend, the bullfighter Carlos Arruza, turning down profitable Hollywood offers and suffering humiliation and despair to stay with the project, including sickness, bankruptcy and confinement in both jail and asylum (all of which is detailed in his autobiography When in Disgrace). Arruza was finally completed in 1968 and released in Mexico in 1971 and the US in 1972.

Return to Hollywood
Boetticher returned to Hollywood with the rarely seen A Time for Dying, a collaboration with Audie Murphy shot in 1969 and not released widely until 1982. He provided the story for Don Siegel's Two Mules for Sister Sara (1970).

In later years, he was known for the documentary My Kingdom For... (1985) and his appearance as a judge in Robert Towne's Tequila Sunrise (1988), and he was still actively attempting to get his screenplay "A Horse for Mr. Barnum" made, before his death in 2001. He and his wife Mary spent much of their later years traveling to film festivals around the world, especially in Europe. His last public appearance, less than three months before his death, was at Cinecon, a classic film festival held in Hollywood, California.

Filmography

Of Mice and Men (1939) – horse wrangler
A Chump at Oxford (1940)- crew
Blood and Sand (1941) – technical adviser
Military Training (1941) (short) – assistant director
Submarine Raider (1942) – uncredited director
The More the Merrier (1943) – assistant director
The Desperadoes (1943) – assistant director
Destroyer (1943) – assistant director
Cover Girl (1944) – assistant director
The Girl in the Case (1944) – assistant director
U-Boat Prisoner (1944) aka Dangerous Mists – uncredited
One Mysterious Night (1944) aka Behind Closed Doors – director
The Missing Juror (1944) – director
Youth on Trial (1945) – director
A Guy, a Gal and a Pal (1945) – director
Escape in the Fog (1945) – director
The Fleet that Came to Stay (1945) (documentary) – director
Assigned to Danger (1948) – director
Behind Locked Doors (1948) – director
Black Midnight (1949) – director
The Wolf Hunters (1949) – director
Killer Shark (1950) – director
The Maganvox Theater (1950) (TV series) – episode "The Three Musketeers" – director
Bullfighter and the Lady (1951) – director, producer, story
The Cimarron Kid (1952) – director
Bronco Buster (1952) – director
Red Ball Express (1952) – director
Horizons West (1952) – director
Seminole (1953) – director
City Beneath the Sea (1953) – director
The Man from the Alamo (1953) – director
Wings of the Hawk (1953) – director
East of Sumatra (1953) – director
The Public Defender (1954) (TV series) – director
The Magnificent Matador (1955) aka The Brave and the Beautiful – director, story
Seven Men from Now (1956) – director
The Killer Is Loose (1956) – director
General Electric Summer Originals (1956) (TV series) – episode "Alias Mike Hecules" – director
The Count of Monte Cristo (1956) (TV series) – episode "The Affair of the Three Napoleons" – director
The Tall T (1957) – director
Maverick (1957) – various episodes – directorDecision at Sundown (1957) – directorBuchanan Rides Alone (1958) – directorRide Lonesome (1959) – director, producerWestbound (1959) – directorComanche Station (1960) – director, producerHong Kong (1960) (TV series)- episode "Colonel Cat" – directorThe Rise and Fall of Legs Diamond (1960) – directorDick Powell's Zane Grey Theater (1960–61) (TV series) – director of various episodesDeath Valley Days (TV series) – episode "South of Horror Flats" – directorThe Rifleman (1961) (TV series) – episode "Stopover" – directorA Time for Dying (1969) – director, writerTwo Mules for Sister Sara (1970) – story onlyArruza (1971) (documentary) – director, producerMy Kingdom For... (1985) (documentary) – director, producerTequila Sunrise'' (1988) – actor only

References

External links
 
 They Shoot Pictures, Don't They?
 Bruce Hodsdon, 'Budd Boetticher and the Westerns of Ranown', Senses of Cinema 18 July 2001
 John Flaus, 'Budd Boetticher', Senses of Cinema 18 September 2001
 Budd Boetticher at  TCMDB
 Sean Axmaker, 'Budd Boetticher, Last of the Old Hollywood Two-Fisted Directors', Green Cine, 16 December 2005
 Sean Axmaker, 'Ride Lonesome: The Career of Budd Boetticher', Senses of Cinema 7 February 2006
 Budd Boetticher at Film Reference
 Literature on Budd Boetticher

1916 births
2001 deaths
Western (genre) film directors
Ohio State University alumni
People from Evansville, Indiana
Film directors from Indiana
Culver Academies alumni
United States Navy personnel of World War II
United States Navy officers